Chandanwadi may refer to:

Chandanwadi, Thane, a neighbourhood in Thane city, Maharashtra, India
Chandanwadi, Mumbai, a neighbourhood in Mumbai, Maharashtra, India